The Asia Sentinel is a web-based publication focused on Asian regional news, business, arts and culture. The site was launched in August 2006.

Its "About Us" page stated that "Asia Sentinel was created to provide a platform for news, analysis and opinion on national and regional issues in Asia. It is independent of all governments and major media enterprises. It is open to contributions not only from journalists but from professionals in fields such as finance, diplomacy, science and the arts. It has no ideology other than a belief in the benefits of a free media. It will not publish editorials but give free rein to diverse opinions."

In 2017, the publication's parent company in Hong Kong ceased operations, and assets were transferred to a new company, registered in California, that owns all newly written stories.

Establishment 
Headquartered originally in Hong Kong, it was founded by four senior expatriate journalists with long experience in the region. The Editor in Chief, John Berthelsen, is a former correspondent with The Wall Street Journal Asia who was also the Newsweek correspondent in Vietnam and Managing Editor of Hong Kong Standard. Co-founder Philip Bowring is the former editor of the Far Eastern Economic Review and a former columnist for the International Herald Tribune. Executive Editor A. Lin Neumann, a veteran reporter, is the former Executive Editor of The Standard and also represented the Committee to Protect Journalists in Asia for many years. Neumann parted ways amicably with Asia Sentinel in 2012. The fourth founder, Anthony Spaeth, is a former Time Asia regional correspondent who left Asia Sentinel shortly after its founding to go to work for Bloomberg.

The editors have lived in or covered most of the countries in Asia, including Vietnam, Malaysia, the Philippines, South Korea, Hong Kong, China, Thailand and Indonesia.

Response to shrinking Asia coverage 
The site is a response to the shrinking coverage of Asia in regional western-owned publications, notably Asiaweek, which was shut down by Time Inc. in 2002; and the Far Eastern Economic Review, which went from being a weekly news magazine to a monthly journal when Dow Jones & Co. was cutting costs in 2004.

The correspondents for the site are drawn from journalists around the region and the site says it is always looking for contributors.

Asia Sentinel articles also appear in the Asian Correspondent.

References

External links 
 Asia Sentinel official site
 John Berthelsen on the Future of Asia Sentinel
 Why Asia Sentinel will survive, opinion piece reviewing the Asia Sentinel

2006 establishments in Hong Kong
Magazines published in Hong Kong
Local interest magazines
Magazines established in 2006
Online magazines
News magazines published in Asia